Jesper Tydén (born August 9, 1975) is a stage actor and singer from Stockholm, Sweden.

Biography
Jesper Tydén, born in Stockholm/Sweden, started his Vocal and Musical education at the Royal Music Conservatory in Stockholm. Throughout his studies he was a member of the Eric Ericsson Chamber Choir and the Swedish Radio Choir. His acting experience and bachelor in musicaltheatre he got from “Artisten” the Theatre and Opera school in Gothenburg. After graduating, Jesper was hired to play leading roles by numerous major musical theatres and productions throughout Europe including Disney’s worldpremiere of “The Hunchback of Notre Dame” 2000 in Berlin/Germany, “Elisabeth” 2001/02 in Essen/Germany, “Miss Saigon” 2003/04 in St.Gallen/Switzerland, “Elisabeth” 2003/04 in Vienna/Austria, “West Side Story” 2003/04 in Bregenz/Austria, “Dracula” (European Premiere) 2005 in St.Gallen/Switzerland & Graz, “Robin Hood” (World Premiere) 2005 in Bremen/Germany, “Les Misérables” 2007 in St. Gallen/Switzerland & Graz/Austria and “Tutanchamun” (World Premiere) 2008 in Gutenstein/Austria. In 2009 he played “Les Misérables” in Klagenfurt/Austria and “La Belle Bizarre du Moulin Rouge” a European Tour. In 2009/10 he played the part of Toby in "Sweeney Todd", Radames “AIDA”, Padre “MANN VON LA MANCHA” D’Artagnan“3 Musketeers”. He has recorded 7 Cast CD’s & 2 Pop singles and is an appreciated soloist in numerous concerts and galas.

Stage Work
Der Glöckner von Notre Dame (Berlin) - Phoebus (1999)
Elisabeth (Essen) - Rudolf/understudy der Tod (2001/2001)
Miss Saigon - (St. Gallen) Chris (2003/2004)
West Side Story - (Bregenz) Tony (2003/2004)
Elisabeth (Vienna) - Rudolf/understudy der Tod (2003–2004)
Jesus Christ Superstar - (Essen, Berlin) Jesus (2004)
Dracula, the Musical (St. Gallen) - Jonathan Harker (2005)
Robin Hood (Bremen, München) - Robin Hood (2005/2006)
Les Misérables - (St. Gallen) Marius (2006–2007)
Dracula, the Musical (Graz) - Jonathan Harker (2007)
Les Misérables - (Graz) Marius (2007–2008)
Tutanchamun - Das Musical - Tutanchamun (2008)
La belle bizarre du Moulin Rouge (Touring D,A,Ch) - Armand (2008–2009)
Les Misérables - (Klagenfurt) Marius (2009)
Sweeney Todd (Klagenfurt) - Toby (2009)
Tutanchamun - Das Musical - (Cairo) Tutanchamun (2010)
Aida - Radames - Schloss Festspiele Ettlingen/Germany ( July/August 2012)
Der mann von La Mancha - Padre - Theater am Gärtnerplatz München/Germany ( Oct/Dec 2013)
West Side Story - Tony -  Graz/Austria ( Jun/July 2014)
Drei Musketiere - D'Artagnan - Tourproduction/Germany ( Oct/Dec 2014)

Discography

Cast Recordings

Tutanchamun - Das Musical - Tutanchamun (2008)
The Count of Monte Cristo (English Demo) - Albert (2008)
Robin Hood (Bremen) - Robin Hood (2005/2006)
Dracula, the Musical (Graz) - Jonathan Harker (2007)
La belle bizarre du Moulin Rouge (Touring) - Armand (2008–2009)
Tutanchamun - Das Musical - Tutanchamun (2010) (October/November 2010)

Studio albums
How Could I (Single)
Let It Ride (Single)
The Drunken Sailors (with Henrik Westerberg)

Miscellaneous
Musical Stars Volume 2 (Vocalist)

References

External links
 Official website
 Official MySpace
 Drunken Sailors Official MySpace

1975 births
Swedish male musical theatre actors
Living people
Male actors from Stockholm